Parangalitsa Peak is the rocky peak rising to 3037 m to form the south extremity of Veregava Ridge on the east side of Sentinel Range in Ellsworth Mountains, Antarctica.  It is surmounting Dater Glacier to the west and its tributary Hansen Glacier to the east.

The feature is named after Parangalitsa Nature Reserve in Rila Mountain, Bulgaria.

Location
US mapping in 1988.

See also
 Mountains in Antarctica

Maps
 Vinson Massif.  Scale 1:250 000 topographic map.  Reston, Virginia: US Geological Survey, 1988.
 Antarctic Digital Database (ADD). Scale 1:250000 topographic map of Antarctica. Scientific Committee on Antarctic Research (SCAR). Since 1993, regularly updated.

Notes

References
 Parangalitsa Peak SCAR Composite Antarctic Gazetteer
 Bulgarian Antarctic Gazetteer Antarctic Place-names Commission (in Bulgarian)
 Basic data (in English)

External links
 Parangalitsa Peak. Copernix satellite image

Mountains of Ellsworth Land
Bulgaria and the Antarctic